Something Different may refer to:
Something Different (1920 film), a lost 1920 American silent drama
Something Different (1963 film), a 1963 Czechoslovak film
Something Different (play), a 1967 comedy play by Carl Reiner

Music
Something Different (Dexter Gordon album), 1980
Something Different (Sidewalk Prophets album), 2015
"Something Different" (Godsmack song), 2014
"Something Different" (Why Don't We song), 2017
Something Different!!!!! (Albert Ayler album), 1963
"Something Different", a 1995 song by Shaggy from Boombastic